is a Japanese photographer.

References
Nihon shashinka jiten / 328 Outstanding Japanese Photographers. Kyoto: Tankōsha, 2000. .  Despite the English-language alternative title, all in Japanese.

External links
 Personal website

Japanese photographers
1938 births
Living people
Place of birth missing (living people)
20th-century Japanese photographers